CFMMEU v Personnel Contracting, [2022] HCA 1, was the first judgement of the High Court of Australia of 2022. It involved the employment relationship between an individual who signed a contract for services and a labour hire organisation. In a decision led by Chief Justice Susan Kiefel, the High Court departed from the approach widely taken by lower courts in holding a "multi-factorial" approach to determining an employment relationship. The High Court found the totality of the circumstances was not always the correct approach for identifying whether an individual was engaged as an employee or independent contractor. Rather, the contents of a contract may instead indicate the relationship.

Background 
CFMMEU v Personnel Contracting involved an appeal from the Construction, Forestry, Maritime Mining and Energy Union on behalf of an individual named Daniel McCourt, a British backpacker in Australia. McCourt had obtained work through a labour hire company named Personnel, which engaged him through an "Administrative Services Agreement" that described him as a "self employed contractor". 

Personnel assigned McCourt to work on construction sites run by its client, Hanssen, with whom McCourt never signed an employment contract. Because Personnel had a contract to provide labour hire services to its client, this created a trilateral agreement. McCourt performed labouring tasks for which he was compensated with an hourly rate. This hourly rate was significantly lower than the rate to which McCourt would have been entitled if he had been engaged by Personnel as their employee, rather than an independent contractor.

In conjunction with the CFMMEU who acted as his union representative, McCourt commenced proceedings against Personnel in the Federal Court of Australia. The parties sought orders against Personnel for compensation and penalties pursuant to the civil remedies provisions of the Fair Work Act 2009 (Cth). The crucial issue was whether McCourt was an employee of Personnel or an independent contractor. 

Both the trial judge and the Full Court of the Federal Court applied the "multi-factorial" test to McCourt's engagement. This meant the written contract and the conduct of the parties examined. The trial judge, Justice O'Callaghan, observed the terms of the Administrative Services Agreement "clearly indicated that the relationship between [Personnel] and McCourt was to be one of principal and self-employed contractor". O'Callaghan noted the factors included McCourt being referred to as "Contractor" rather than "employee", that McCourt warranted he was self-employed, and that McCourt agreed not to represent himself as being an employee of Personnel". An appeal to the Full Court was dismissed. The Full Court found McCourt's engagement on its face appeared to be one of employment, however the terms within the signed Administrative Services Agreement indicated he was a self employed contractor. In dismissing the appeal, Chief Justice Allsop and Justice Lee questioned the idea of allowing unskilled workers to be paid as contractors at less than the minimum wage employees are entitled, but noted they were unable to divert from precedent.  Chief Justice Allsop noted that if not for this precedent, he would have found in favour of an employment relationship.

High Court appeal 

Stewart et al. noted the dispute over McCourt's status was viewed by the High Court as an opportunity to reconsider what factors determine employment status. A "multi-factor" test had been used by various courts for decades with no single test for identifying an employment relationship. Instead, assessing the totality of circumstances to reach an overall view of the relationship was necessary. Several justices in CFMMEU v Personnel Contracting took the view this approach was difficult and created uncertainties, though none directly challenged the test. In a 6:1 decision, the High Court allowed the appeal and found McCourt was an employee of Personnel.

In what was described as a "considerable departure", the High Court majority found the "multi-factor" test was not relevant to the facts in this case, and found the relationship between the parties should in this instance be determined by the written contract. As McCourt's obligation to Personnel under his Administrative Services Agreement was a promise to work as directed by Personnel or its client, McCourt was not running his own business and hence could not have been an independent contractor. The majority judgement was a significant shift in the High Court's treatment of employment relationships, and meant the approach would not be to treat the construction of employment contracts like any other. Justice Steward dissented, stating the appeal will "greatly damage the [business of Personnel and that] of many others".

While the High Court found in favour of McCourt, the decision ultimately was expected to make existing independent contracting arrangements more secure, provided they are written clearly. Professor Andrew Stewart of the University of Adelaide noted it "widened a loophole" and was a win for companies that use independent contractors. Stewart further noted the decision reduced the risk for employers provided contracts contained the correct language. Innes Willox of the Australian Industry Group stated the decision "will increase business certainty and investment and will consequently be good for jobs. He noted that businesses have been faced with increasing arguments that people engaged as independent contractors have been done so incorrectly and are in fact entitled to employee benefits, and that this decision provides certainty with regard to such instances.

Footnotes

References

Bibliography 
Academic literature

Legal cases

News articles

High Court of Australia cases
2022 in Australian law
Australian labour case law
2022 in case law